West Aliquippa is a neighborhood in Aliquippa, Pennsylvania, United States. The community is actually located just north of the city of Aliquippa, from which it derives its name. West Aliquippa is located on the Ohio River. It shares a ZIP code with Aliquippa: 15001.

West Aliquippa is part of the Aliquippa City School District.

Unincorporated communities in Beaver County, Pennsylvania
Pittsburgh metropolitan area
Unincorporated communities in Pennsylvania